Heman Allen may refer to:

 Heman Allen (of Cornwall) (1740–1778), Vermont patriot and brother of Ethan Allen
 Heman Allen (of Colchester) (1779–1852), U.S. Representative from Colchester, Vermont (1817–1818), U.S. Minister Plenipotentiary to Chile
 Heman Allen (of Milton) (1777–1844), U.S. Representative from Milton, Vermont (1831–1839)

See also
Heman Allen Moore (1809–1844), U.S. Representative from Ohio